Barry Padley (born 22 October 1949) is a former Australian rules footballer who played with Fitzroy in the Victorian Football League (VFL).

Padley was a utility, recruited from Diamond Valley Football League side Reservoir-Lakeside.

In his first season, he was badly injured in a game against St Kilda, puncturing a lung and breaking four ribs.

Padley kicked 24 goals in the 1971 VFL season, a career high.

He was a member of Fitzroy's 1978 night premiership team.

Padley coached Heidelberg in 1981 and 1982, winning their best and fairest award in the first of those years.

References

1949 births
Australian rules footballers from Melbourne
Fitzroy Football Club players
Heidelberg Football Club players
Reservoir Lakeside Football Club players
Living people
Australian rules football coaches
People from Albert Park, Victoria